Zullinger is an unincorporated community in Franklin County, Pennsylvania, United States. Zullinger has a post office, with ZIP code 17272.

References

Unincorporated communities in Franklin County, Pennsylvania
Unincorporated communities in Pennsylvania